The tournament in Sobota was a new addition to the ITF Women's Circuit.

The second seed Kristína Kučová won the title, defeating Sesil Karatantcheva in the final, 1–6, 7–5, 6–3.

Seeds

Main draw

Finals

Top half

Bottom half

References 
 Main draw

Powiat Poznanski Open - Singles
WSG Open